Victoria and Her Hussar is a 1954 West German musical film directed by Rudolf Schündler and starring Eva Bartok, Friedrich Schoenfelder and Rudolf Forster. Part of the tradition of operetta films, it is an adaptation of the 1930 operetta Viktoria und ihr Husar by Paul Abraham. A previous film adaptation Victoria and Her Hussar had already been produced in 1931 by Richard Oswald.

It was made at the Wandsbek Studios in Hamburg. The film's sets were designed by the art director Dieter Bartels and Felix Smetana.

Partial cast
 Eva Bartok as Viktoria
 Friedrich Schoenfelder as Sandor Koltay
 Rudolf Forster as Fitzroy
 Grethe Weiser as Ursula Knepke
 Georg Thomalla as Janczi

References

Bibliography
 Bock, Hans-Michael & Bergfelder, Tim. The Concise CineGraph. Encyclopedia of German Cinema. Berghahn Books, 2009.

External links
 

1954 films
1954 musical films
German musical films
West German films
1950s German-language films
Films directed by Rudolf Schündler
Films based on operettas
Remakes of German films
Films set in Hamburg
Films shot at Wandsbek Studios
Operetta films
1950s German films